God's Not Dead: We the People is a 2021 American Christian drama film directed by Vance Null, with a script written by Tommy Blaze, from an original story co-authored by Cary Solomon and Chuck Konzelman. The sequel to God's Not Dead: A Light in Darkness and the fourth installment in the God's Not Dead series, the plot centers around Rev. David "Dave" Hill's role in presenting a case for God before Congress. The film was released on October 4, 2021, in a three-night theatrical engagement, and grossed over $1.1 million in the domestic box office.

A sequel titled, God's Not Dead: Rise Up is in production and scheduled for a 2023 release.

Plot 
A group of parents led by a local pastor are home-schooling their children when a representative from social services makes an unannounced visit and determines the parents' teaching is not sufficient, in light of the requirements of the common core state standards. A local judge, played by Jeanine Pirro, gives them a week to prove that their education is adequate or the students will be forced to go to public school. The pastor and the parents head to Washington, D.C. to testify in front of a Congressional sub-committee on home-schooling. Much of the last half of the film consists mainly of long speeches by the parents, pastor, and members of Congress over the topic of home-schooling.

Cast 
 David A. R. White as Reverend Dave Hill, a pastor who appeared in all three previous God's Not Dead films.
 Antonio Sabàto Jr. and Francesca Battistelli as Mike and Rebecca McKinnon, a couple who plan to homeschool their child
 Jeanine Pirro as Judge Elizabeth Neely, the local town judge who decides whether the McKinnons will continue to homeschool their children, send them to public school, or have them incarcerated if they refuse. Pirro previously made an uncredited cameo in the third film.
 Isaiah Washington as Rep. Daryl Smith, a Congressman who helps Dave.
 William Forsythe as Senator Robert Benson
Matt Anspach as Brandon McKinnon, Mike and Rebecca's older son
Benjamin Onyango as Reverend Jude Mbaye, a minister from Ghana and Dave Hill's friend who died in the previous film. He appears in a dream to encourage Dave to stand up for freedom.
 Dani Oliveros as Kayla Neely, Judge Neely's daughter who becomes Brandon's girlfriend
 Marco Khan as Misrab, Ayisha's estranged father who rejected her from the first film, and tries to reunite her in an attempt to redeem himself all while deciding whether or not to accept Jesus Christ as savior
 Hadeel Sittu as Ayisha, Misrab's daughter who accepted Christ as savior in the first film, and becomes involved in a car accident
 Paul Kwo as Martin Yip
 Paul Carroll as Congressional Aide

Production 
The film's production was announced on David A. R. White's Instagram in late 2020. It was filmed in Oklahoma during the COVID-19 pandemic.

Reception 
The film, like its predecessors, was largely panned by critics. Steve Pulaski of Influx Magazine gave the film a rare "F" letter-grade, criticizing the plot and message saying, "God's Not Dead: We the People is not merely the worst in an already-misbegotten series, but so utterly deplorable that its status as a three-night-only event in theaters at least assures that significantly fewer people will see it."

Conservative Christian film critic Christian Toto praised the film, stating that while it "shares the franchise’s flaws...its bold mission statement has never been more necessary."

References

External links 
 
 

2021 films
2021 drama films
American legal drama films
American sequel films
2020s English-language films
Films about Christianity
Films about evangelicalism
Films set in Washington, D.C.
Films impacted by the COVID-19 pandemic
Films shot in Oklahoma
Films shot in Washington, D.C.
Pure Flix Entertainment films
Religious drama films
Works about homeschooling and unschooling
Films produced by Brent Ryan Green
2021 directorial debut films
2020s American films
God's Not Dead (film series)